Thomas Aretz (born 5 September 1948) is a German former breaststroke and medley swimmer. He competed at the 1968 Summer Olympics and the 1972 Summer Olympics.  He later earned a MD from Harvard Medical School.

References

External links
 

1948 births
Living people
German male breaststroke swimmers
German male medley swimmers
Olympic swimmers of West Germany
Swimmers at the 1968 Summer Olympics
Swimmers at the 1972 Summer Olympics
People from Miltenberg (district)
Sportspeople from Lower Franconia
Harvard Medical School alumni
20th-century German people